William Henry Fellowes (15 July 1769 – 23 August 1837), of Ramsey Abbey in Huntingdonshire and Haverland Hall in Norfolk, was a British Member of Parliament.

Life
He was the eldest son of William Fellowes and Lavinia Smyth. He matriculated at St John's College, Cambridge in 1796, graduating B.A. in 1790 and M.A. in 1793. He was elected to the House of Commons for Huntingdon in 1796, a seat he held until 1807, and then represented Huntingdonshire from 1807 to 1830.

Fellowes died on 23 August 1837.

Family
Fellowes married Emma Benyon, daughter of Richard Benyon MP: they had four sons and a daughter. Their eldest surviving son Edward Fellowes was elevated to the peerage as Baron de Ramsey in 1887.

The third son, Richard, was Conservative MP for Berkshire. Their grandsons William Fellowes, 2nd Baron de Ramsey, and Ailwyn Fellowes, 1st Baron Ailwyn were both Conservative government ministers. Another grandson, James Herbert Benyon, was Lord Lieutenant of Berkshire.

References
Kidd, Charles, Williamson, David (editors). Debrett's Peerage and Baronetage (1990 edition). New York: St Martin's Press, 1990.

Notes

External links 
 

1769 births
1837 deaths
Members of the Parliament of Great Britain for English constituencies
Members of the Parliament of the United Kingdom for English constituencies
People from Ramsey, Cambridgeshire
People from Broadland (district)
British MPs 1796–1800
UK MPs 1801–1802
UK MPs 1802–1806
UK MPs 1806–1807
UK MPs 1807–1812
UK MPs 1812–1818
UK MPs 1818–1820
UK MPs 1820–1826
UK MPs 1826–1830